Anastasia Andreyevna Ilyankova (born 12 January 2001) is a Russian artistic gymnast. She is the 2020 Olympic silver medalist and 2019 European champion on the uneven bars.

Junior career 
Ilyankova competed at the 2014 L'International Gymnix, where Russia won the team gold medal. She won two gold medals in uneven bars and balance beam at the 2016 European Junior Championships.

Senior career

2017 
Ilyankova was injured at the beginning of the 2017 season, competing only on Bars at the Russian Championships and missing a spot on the Jesolo and European Championships team. Instead, she made her debut at the Osijek World Cup, competing only on Uneven Bars and Balance Beam, winning gold and silver respectively. She later competed at the Russian Cup, winning the Bars title. Her victory in Uneven Bars earned her a place on the provisional Russian 2017 World Championships team to Montreal, Canada.

Ilyankova was prepared for the competition, and traveled to Montréal with the team for the World Championships. She qualified to the uneven bars final with a score of 15.066, less than a tenth of a point behind Elena Eremina and beating teammate Angelina Melnikova for the second spot. In the final, her foot hit the bar on her Shang release, incurring a 3-tenth deduction, leading her to take fourth place behind Nina Derwael of Belgium, Eremina, and Fan Yilin of China.

2018 
In April, Ilyankova competed at the 2018 City of Jesolo trophy event in Italy. She earned a gold medal with the Russian team, a bronze in the all-around behind USA's Ragan Smith and Emma Malabuyo, and gold on the uneven bars, ahead of Smith and teammate Angelina Melnikova. She also finished eighth on balance beam.

2019 
Ilyankova competed at the 2019 Russian Artistic Gymnastics Championships where she placed first on uneven bars.  As a result she was chosen to compete at the 2019 European Championships alongside Angelina Simakova, Angelina Melnikova, and Maria Paseka.  A week later she competed at the Baku World Cup.  She qualified in first place to the uneven bars final.  In the finals she finished in second place behind Lyu Jiaqi of China.  At the Doha World Cup she qualified to the uneven bars final in third place behind Nina Derwael of Belgium and Fan Yilin of China.  In the uneven bars finals, she once again placed third behind Derwael and Fan.

At the European Championships Ilyankova qualified to the uneven bars final in fourth place.  During event finals, she performed a clean routine and placed first ahead of Melnikova and Alice D'Amato of Italy, becoming a European Champion on the event.

In June Ilyankova was named as Aliya Mustafina's replacement for the European Games; she competed alongside Angelina Melnikova and Aleksandra Shchekoldina.  During qualifications she finished third on uneven bars behind Becky Downie of Great Britain and Nina Derwael of Belgium, qualifying to the event final.  She later had to withdraw from the event final due to an allergic reaction.

In August Ilyankova competed at the Russian Cup where she finished fourth on the uneven bars behind Daria Spiridonova, Vladislava Urazova, and Melnikova.  In November she competed at the Cottbus World Cup where she placed sixth on the uneven bars.

2020
Ilyankova competed at the Baku World Cup; during qualifications she finished second on uneven bars behind Fan Yilin and qualified to the event finals.  However event finals were canceled due to the COVID-19 pandemic in Azerbaijan.

2021
Ilyankova competed at the Russian National Championships where she finished seventh on uneven bars after falling off the apparatus.  She next competed at the Russian Cup in June where she finished third on uneven bars behind Vladislava Urazova and Angelina Melnikova.  Ilyankova was selected to represent the Russian Olympic Committee athletes at the 2020 Summer Olympics as an individual athlete.  At the Olympic Games she won the silver medal on the uneven bars behind two-time World champion Nina Derwael.

Competitive history

International Scores

References

External links
 
 Anastasia Ilyankova at sportgymrus.ru 
 

2001 births
Living people
Russian female artistic gymnasts
European champions in gymnastics
Gymnasts at the 2019 European Games
European Games competitors for Russia
People from Leninsk-Kuznetsky
Gymnasts at the 2020 Summer Olympics
Olympic medalists in gymnastics
Medalists at the 2020 Summer Olympics
Olympic silver medalists for the Russian Olympic Committee athletes
Sportspeople from Kemerovo Oblast